Coatascorn is a commune in the Côtes-d'Armor department of Brittany in northwestern France.

Toponymy
The name Coatascorn is typically Breton, "koad" meaning "wood" and "ascorn" meaning "bone".

Population

Inhabitants of Coatascorn are called Coatascornais in French.

Breton language
The municipality launched a linguistic plan through Ya d'ar brezhoneg on 7 July 2006.

See also
Communes of the Côtes-d'Armor department

References

Communes of Côtes-d'Armor